Juliet Wilson–Bareau (born 1935) is a British art historian, curator, and independent scholar, specialising in Francisco Goya and Édouard Manet. From 1993 to 1994, she held the Slade Professorship of Fine Art at the University of Oxford. She curated a show on Goya at the Museo del Prado in Madrid in 1993 and at the Royal Academy of Arts in London in 1994.

Selected works

  
 
  
 
  
  
  
 Wilson-Bareau, Julia, and Degener, David C. (2003). Manet and the American Civil War: The Battle of the U.S.S. Kearsarge and the C.S.S. Alabama, Issued in connection with an exhibition held June 3 - August 17, 2003, Metropolitan Museum of Art, New York.

References

1935 births
Living people
British art historians
Women art historians
British art curators
British women curators
Belgian emigrants to the United Kingdom
British women historians